The 1999 Purdue Boilermakers football team represented Purdue University during the 1999 NCAA Division I-A football season. They played their home games at Ross–Ade Stadium in West Lafayette, Indiana and were members of the Big Ten Conference.

Schedule

Roster

Game summaries

Notre Dame

Source: USA Today

Indiana

Rankings

Awards
 All-Americans: Drew Brees (Playboy, Preseason)
 All-Big Ten: Akin Ayodele (2nd), Adrian Beasley (2nd), Drew Brees (1st), Chris Daniels (1st), Matt Light (2nd), Dave Nugent (2nd), Tim Stratton (1st)
 Team MVP: Chris Daniels

References

Purdue
Purdue Boilermakers football seasons
Purdue Boilermakers football